Mint 400 is  Ammonia's debut studio album. It was released in Australia in October 1995. The album takes its title from an auto race described in Hunter S. Thompson's book Fear and Loathing in Las Vegas.

The album was produced by legendary American producer Kevin Shirley (Led Zeppelin, Iron Maiden, Slayer). Recorded in ten days at Festival Studios in Sydney, the recording captured the band's live sound, avoiding excessive overdubs and studio manipulation.

Mint 400 was an immediate hit in Australia, debuting in the National Album charts at Number 15. The album went out of print in March 2002.

The car on the cover is a custom 1968 Pontiac GTO.

Track listing 
All lyrics written by Allan Balmont, Simon Hensworth and Dave Johnstone except where noted

 "Ken Carter" - 3:55
 "Drugs" (A. Balmont, S. Hensworth) - 3:26
 "Sleepwalking" - 3:10
 "Face Down" - 5:08
 "In a Box" - 2:35
 "Suzi Q" - 2:37
 "Little Death" - 5:23
 "Mint 400" - 2:17
 "Burning Plant Smell" - 3:06
 "Z-Man" - 2:36
 "Million Dollar Man" - 3:55
 "Lucky No. 3" - 3:53

Japanese edition 
 "Ken Carter" - 3:55
 "Drugs" - 3:26
 "Sleepwalking" - 3:10
 "Face Down" - 5:08
 "In a Box" - 2:35
 "Suzi Q" - 2:37
 "Little Death" - 5:23
 "Mint 400" - 2:17
 "Small Town"
 "Burning Plant Smell" - 3:06
 "Z-Man" - 2:36
 "Million Dollar Man" - 3:55
 "Lucky No. 3" - 3:53
 "Orange Juice"

Personnel 

Ammonia
 Allan Balmont - drums
 Simon Hensworth - bass
 Dave Johnstone - guitar, vocals

Additional personnel
 Ted Jensen - Mastering
 Kevin Shirley - Producer, Engineer
 Mark Thomas - Engineer
 John Webber - Photography
 Simon Alderson - Art Direction
 Matt Lovell - Engineer
 Ben Glatzer - Producer

Charts

Release history

References 

1995 debut albums
Ammonia (band) albums
Murmur (record label) albums
Albums produced by Kevin Shirley